Fox 20 may refer to one of the following television stations in the United States affiliated with the Fox Broadcasting Company:

KCVU, Chico, California
WCOV-TV, Montgomery, Alabama